The 1995 Asian Men's Handball Championship was the eighth Asian Championship, which was taking place from 25 September to 6 October 1995 in Kuwait City, Kuwait. It acted as the Asian qualifying tournament for the 1996 Olympic Games.

Preliminary round

Group B

Elimination round

Final round

Placement 7th–9th

Placement 4th–6th

Championship

Final standing

References
Results

Handball
Asian Handball Championships
A
Handball
September 1995 sports events in Asia
October 1995 sports events in Asia